Abarshiveh Rural District is in the Central District of Damavand County, Tehran province, Iran. At the National Census of 2006, its population was 10,059 in 2,951 households. There were 11,492 inhabitants in 3,275 households at the following census of 2011. At the most recent census of 2016, the population of the rural district was 11,567 in 3,541 households. The largest of its 31 villages was Sarbandan, with 3,352 people.

References 

Damavand County

Rural Districts of Tehran Province

Populated places in Tehran Province

Populated places in Damavand County